Cobalt Flux was a game controller manufacturer based in the greater Salt Lake City, Utah area of the United States. One notable product from Cobalt Flux was the polycarbonate plastic and metal-based dance platform, which is used with console dance games such as Dance Dance Revolution. The Cobalt Flux website cobaltflux.org is now a marketplace to buy and sell cobalt flux pads, control boxes, and other items. You can also find advice and support on pad modification, maintenance and repair.

Cobalt Flux Dance Platform

Intro 
The Cobalt Flux dance platform is a dance pad made of polycarbonate plastic and metal. It is used with console dance games such as Dance Dance Revolution.

Design 
Fundamentally, the Cobalt Flux dance platform is similar to most dance pad designs. Instead of the typical four arrow plus corners panel layout as is common in soft dance pads, there are nine usable foot panels (center, left, right, up, down, and corners).

Internally, the Cobalt Flux dance platform is unique among typical hard/metal dance pad designs. Official Dance Dance Revolution arcade machine dance pads contain a hollow area beneath each panel with small sensor switches. The Cobalt Flux design contains no hollow areas. Sensor contact is achieved by the flexing of layers of lexan panels and metal plates on a solid wood base. This results in a simple platform design and therefore increased durability.

The Cobalt Flux dance platform itself connects to a "control box", which contains the start and select buttons for the dance controller. The connection to the control box uses a 15-pin serial connector which hangs out of the top of the pad as a dongle. This control box also handles the wiring needed for different gaming console connectors, which lead off of the control box. The control box is removable.

Aesthetics 
The Cobalt Flux dance platform is often used with shoes, as is common on traditional arcade dance platforms.

Cobalt Flux have provided two modification kits/options for their dance platforms. One kit adds raised black textured panels to the corner panels, and more closely mimics the feel of the arcade platforms.

Reliability 
Cobalt Flux dance platforms are considered to be among the most reliable according to dance game enthusiasts; however, there are also anecdotes of less than high reliability.

A demonstration of reliability is given in the YouTube video, "The Cobalt Flux survives!". In the video, a Cobalt Flux dance platform being run over by several vehicles. It is then carried inside, plugged in and shown as still functioning.

Game and System Compatibility 

The pad is compatible with both DDR style games (using four arrows), and Pump It Up simulators (using five buttons). However, official Pump It Up compatibility requires a separate control box, and the corner square panels are smaller than their rectangular equivalents in Pump It Up. It is also compatible with the existing eight arrow Dance UK game

The original control box shipped with Cobalt Flux pads was designed to work only with the PlayStation 2; many home players wanted to use the pad with an Xbox or PC, but running this control box through converters for standard PS2 controllers usually caused an unacceptable amount of latency during play. Cobalt Flux has since released a new control box with built-in connectivity for PS2, Xbox, and the PC.

There is also a special Pump It Up version of the control box that enables the center sensor and properly maps all buttons in order to play Pump It Up without issue. This version connects to PS2 only.

Design Concerns 
The design of the standard dance platform allocates for each panel to be at the same height, with a small gap between each panel. Experienced arcade players often dislike the flat feel. The black panel modification kit that Cobalt Flux produces attempts to simulate arcade-style inset arrow panels.

Other concerns on the design include mobility and safety. The wood base adds considerable weight and bulk, although it has a slimmer profile and is lighter than arcade dance platforms. However, many buyers of Cobalt Flux dance platforms have set them up permanently.

The connection to the control box uses a cable which hangs out of the top of the pad as a dongle. If one is careless in setting down the pad it may be possible to sever this connector.

Additional Versions 
In 2005, Cobalt Flux began to offer more durable dance platform variations with extended warranties and additional features like monitor mounts. These were installed at schools, fitness centers, and other institutions, and had identifying decals and black trim to distinguish them from the residential pads. 

These commercial versions are intended to be fixed in place and also have shock absorbing material included to lessen joint strain. The heaviest duty commercial mat is built to US military specification and has a four-year warranty. School platforms have handles as these tend to be set up and packed away.

Modification 
It is possible, with knowledge of the dance platform's pinout, to build your own control box. This is especially popular for the Xbox, as a control box built with the electronics from a soft dance pad will be properly recognized as a dance pad, not a controller.

The Flux is shipped with the central panel de-activated. This central panel is used in Pump It Up, and a procedure in the user manual describes how to activate it.

It is possible to adjust the height of unused panels by inserting a piece of cardboard or a shim underneath the panel.

Blufit System 
In 2009 Cobalt Flux launched a system called Blufit which is an eight mat wireless multiplayer system with their own proprietary dance software, Streetfeet. Eight of these would link together into a 64 player system, making it the largest gaming console in the world . Other active or fitnessgames could be played on it using either the dance pad as a controller, or other input peripherals.

Dark Ops 
The last consumer product released by Cobalt Flux was the Dark Ops Wiimote attachment.

Demise 
On October 29, 2011, the website of Cobalt Flux was discovered offline. Later in 2011, Bemanistyle confirmed that Cobalt Flux had gone out of business. Cobaltflux.com is now parked by GoDaddy.

External links
 CobaltFlux.com
 Official Cobalt Flux forums
 Review of the Cobalt Flux dance platform at Netjak

Notes

Dance pads